The 2009 FIM Sidecarcross world championship, the 30th edition of the competition, started on 29 March and finished after thirteen race weekends on 13 September 2009.

After six championships in a row for Daniël Willemsen, the 2009 edition was won by Joris Hendrickx from Belgium. His passenger, Kaspars Liepiņš, is from Latvia.

Parallel to the riders competition, a manufacturers championship was also held and won by Vruwink MotorCycles - VMC.

Overview

The 2009 season was the 30th edition of the sidecarcross world championship. The defending champion was Daniël Willemsen from the Netherlands. He started the season with a new passenger, having parted with the Swiss Reto Grütter, whom he won the 2007 and 2008 title with. After 17 seasons in the sidecarcross world championship, former five-time world champion Kristers Sergis had announced his retirement from the competition, having finished his career with a second place in the 2008 edition. Another former world champion to retire from the competition was Marcel Willemsen, but he did still take part in one more Grand Prix during the season. With Kaspars Stupelis and Sven Verbrugge, two riders who had won world championships as passengers with Daniël Willemsen also took part in the competition, the later reunited with Willemsen in a team.

The thirteen races of the season were held in eleven countries, Switzerland, France, Belgium, Ukraine, Netherlands, Latvia, Estonia, Russia, Denmark, Poland and Germany. It was the first time since 2001, that the championship had returned to the traditional sidecarcross nation of Switzerland. Russia was on the calendar only for the second time, the previous race having been scheduled to be held in Moscow in 2004 but being cancelled because of heavy rain. Poland hosted a race for the first time. The competition however did not return to Great Britain who held its last event in 2001.

Format

Every Grand Prix weekend is split into two races, both held on the same day. Thus the 2011 season with its thirteen Grand Prix had 26 races. Each race lasts for 30 minutes plus two laps. The two races on a weekend get combined to determine an overall winner. In case of a tie, the results of the second race are used to determine the winner. While this overall winner receives no extra WC points, they usually are awarded a special trophy. Race start times are set at 13:30 and 16:00.

Events typically consist of a qualifying competition, held in multiple stages on Saturdays of a race weekend while the two race events are typically held on Sundays. One exception to this rule is Easter weekends, when the races are held on Easter Monday. Race weekends can consist of additional motocross or quart support races as well, but the FIM stipulates that the World Championship races have priority. Riders have to be provided with at least one 30-minute free practice season, which will be timed. A race can consist of up to 30 starters and the qualifying modus is dependent on the number of entries. With up to 32 entries, it will be held in one group split into two sessions of 30 minutes each. Above 32 entries, the starter field will be sub-divided into two groups through ballot and the current standings. Each qualifying group can consist of up to 30 racers. Should there be more than 60 entries, a pre-qualifying has to be held. Of the riders in the two groups, the top twelve directly qualify for the races. The remaining teams then go to a second-chance qualifying, in which the best six advance. The riders placed seventh and eighth remain in reserve should one of the qualified teams not be able to participate.

The FIM stipulates that all drivers must be of a minimum age of 18 while passengers have to be at least 16 years old to compete, but no older than 50. Riders older than 50 have to provide a certificate of medical fitness to be permitted to compete. The driver has the right to exchange his passenger under certain conditions.

Starting numbers for the season are awarded according to the previous season's overall finishing position of the driver. Current or former World Champions have however the right to pick any number they wish, except the number one, which is reserved for the current World Champion.

The competition is open for motor cycles with two-stroke engines from between 350 and 750 cc and four-stroke engines of up to 1,000 cc. Each team is permitted the use of two motorcycles with the possibility of changing machines between races.

The FIM does not permit radio communication between riders and their teams. Outside assistance during the race on the course is not permitted unless it is through race marshals in the interest of safety. Limited repairs in the designated repair zone during the race are permitted.

The first twenty teams of each race score competition points. The point system for the 2009 season was as follows:

Prize money
Prize money and travel reimbursements in the sport are not large, sidecarcross still qualifying mostly as an amateur sport. In the 2009 season for example, every team received Euro 500 as a travel indemnity per race weekend qualified for. Additionally, prize money was paid, with the winner earning €300, the second placed team €250, the third placed team €200. With the prize money gradually dropping off from there, the teams placed twelfth to twentieth still received €50 each.

Calendar
The calendar for the 2009 season:

 The Sidecarcross des Nations in Jauer on 27 September 2009 is a non-championship event but part of the calendar and is denoted by a light blue background in the table above.

Classification

Riders
The final standings of the 2009 season:

 Equipment listed is motor and frame.

Manufacturers
Parallel to the riders championship, a manufacturers competition is also held. In every race, only the best-placed rider of every make is awarded points in this competition.

The final standings in the manufacturers competition were:

References

External links
 The World Championship on Sidecarcross.com
 The John Davey Grand Prix Pages – Results of all GP's up until 2005
 FIM Sidecar Motocross World Championship

Sidecarcross world chmapionship, 2009
Sidecarcross World Championship seasons